ASK/Ogre was an ice hockey club in Ogre, Latvia founded in 2003. Their home arena was Vidzemes Ledus Halle.

The team finished second in the Latvian championships in the 2003/04, 2004/05, 2006/07 and 2007/08 seasons. In 2008/09 they played in the Belarusian Extraliga, finishing the season with just 10 wins in 52 games. They ceased operations at the conclusion of the season.

Notable players

 Edgars Adamovičs
 Jānis Brakšs
 Andrejs Ignatovičs
 Aleksandrs Kerčs Sr.
 Vladislavs Vodolažskis

External links
players in season 2005/2006
players in season 2004/2005
player statistics in season 2003/2004

Ogre, Latvia
Latvian Hockey League teams
Ice hockey teams in Latvia
Belarusian Extraleague teams
Eastern European Hockey League teams
2003 establishments in Latvia
2009 disestablishments in Latvia
Ice hockey clubs established in 2003
Ice hockey clubs disestablished in 2009